George Ray was an English professional footballer who played as a right half.

Career
Born in Manchester, Ray joined Bradford City from Frizington in November 1927. He made 2 league appearances for the club, before moving to Derry City in July 1929.

Sources

References

Date of birth missing
Date of death missing
English footballers
Bradford City A.F.C. players
Derry City F.C. players
English Football League players
Association football wing halves